Urunkhayka (Ürünhaika) is a small village in Kazakhstan. It is on the eastern border of Lake Markakol in Katonkaragay District of East Kazakhstan Region.

External links

Populated places in East Kazakhstan Region